Ekrejegbe is a village  in Ughelli South Local Government Area of Delta State, Nigeria, having boundaries with Ekakpamre. The people are mostly Christian and traditional worshippers.
One of the streets in Ekrejegbe village is called Ekrogbe Quarters.

On 17 September 1999, Ekrejegbe was among some Ughievwen communities affected by an oil spillage that resulted in a fire.

On 20 April 2018, Ekrejegbe was one of the two Ughievwen communities, where the Delta State Governor Ifeanyi Okowa performed a "ground-breaking ceremony for a 400MW combined cycle power plant".

References

Populated places in Delta State